The 1899 Georgia Bulldogs football team represented the Georgia Bulldogs of the University of Georgia during the 1899 Southern Intercollegiate Athletic Association football season. The team competed as a member of the Southern Intercollegiate Athletic Association (SIAA) and completed the season with a disappointing 2–3–1 record. However, a season highlight was the third-straight victory over Georgia Tech. 1899 also saw the first meeting between the Georgia Bulldogs and Tennessee (a loss for Georgia).  This was the team's first and only season under the guidance of head coach Gordon Saussy.

The 1890s saw the football program at Georgia get a good start.

Schedule

References

Georgia
Georgia Bulldogs football seasons
Georgia Bulldogs football